Mönchengladbach-Lürrip station is a through station in the town of Mönchengladbach in the German state of North Rhine-Westphalia. The station was opened in 1980 or 1981 on the Mönchengladbach–Düsseldorf railway opened between Mönchengladbach and Neuss by the Aachen-Düsseldorf-Ruhrort Railway Company on 16 December 1852. It has two platform tracks and it is classified by Deutsche Bahn as a category 6 station.

The station is served by Rhine-Ruhr S-Bahn lines S 8 between Mönchengladbach and Wuppertal-Oberbarmen or Hagen every 20 minutes.

References

S8 (Rhine-Ruhr S-Bahn)
Rhine-Ruhr S-Bahn stations
Railway stations in Germany opened in 1980
Railway stations in Germany opened in 1981
Buildings and structures in Mönchengladbach